Telefon may refer to:

Telefon (film), a 1977 film directed by Don Siegel, starring Charles Bronson
"Telefon, Telefon", a song by Margot Hielscher
Telefon Bay, in the South Shetland Islands
Telefon Point, west of the entrance to Admiralty Bay, King George Island
Telefon Ridge, in the South Shetland Islands
Telefon Rocks, a group of rocks in King George Island, the South Shetland Islands
The Norwegian steamship SS Telefon